German submarine U-171 was a Type IXC U-boat of Germany's Kriegsmarine built for service during World War II. It was laid down on 1 December 1940 at the DeSchiMAG AG Weser yard at Bremen as yard number 1011, launched on 22 July 1941, and commissioned on 25 October 1941 under the command of Kapitänleutnant Günther Pfeffer.

After training with the 4th U-boat Flotilla, U-171 was transferred to the 10th U-boat Flotilla for front-line service on 1 July 1942. It was sent to patrol in the Gulf of Mexico. It was sunk by a naval mine in the Bay of Biscay 115 days into its first and only patrol, whilst returning to Lorient in occupied France, with the loss of 22 of its crew of 54. For many years it was believed  was sunk by an American aircraft in what was, in reality, an unsuccessful attack on U-171 in the Gulf of Mexico.

Design
German Type IXC submarines were slightly larger than the original Type IXBs. U-171 had a displacement of  when at the surface and  while submerged. She had two shafts and two  propellers.

U-171 was fitted with six  torpedo tubes (four fitted at the bow and two at the stern), 22 torpedoes, one  SK C/32 naval gun, 180 rounds, and a  SK C/30 as well as a  C/30 anti-aircraft gun. The boat had a complement of forty-eight.

Service history

Patrol
U-171 departed Kiel on 17 June 1942, at the end of which it was to return to Lorient, where it would be based for future sorties. It negotiated the 'gap' between Iceland and the Faroe Islands and crossed the Atlantic Ocean, entering the Gulf of Mexico.

The ship was at the time en route from New Orleans to Tampico via Veracruz. The first spread of two torpedoes missed the ship, but a second spread, also of two eels (German U-Boat slang for torpedoes), was successful when one hit the port side near the fore-part of the ship. Six of the crew of 45 died.

On 1 August 1942, also in the Gulf of Mexico, U-171 came under attack from a U.S. Coast Guard J4F-1 Widgeon aircraft, causing it little damage.

The wreckage of U-166 was discovered in 2001, just a short distance from its last victim, Robert E. Lee, meaning that the credit for the sinking of U-166 should have gone to the U.S. Navy patrol craft, PC-566, which had reported that they believed they were successful in their depth charge attack on the submarine following the U-boat's successful torpedoing of Robert E. Lee, but PC-566 were believed by investigating officials to have missed.

Having not been sunk, as had been believed by the Allies, U-171 continued its patrol. The ship, which was carrying water ballast, was struck by two torpedoes; the submarine then surfaced and fired five rounds from its deck gun into the wreck. The whole crew of 44 survived, being picked up eight hours later by the United States Coast Guard auxiliary .

This ship had evaded three spreads of two torpedoes each, before being hit by a torpedo fired from U-171s stern tube. There were 10 dead and 24 survivors.

Loss
U-171 was sunk at 13:00 hours on 9 October 1942 in the Bay of Biscay near Lorient, in position , by a mine. Twenty-two men died, thirty survived. Captain Günther Pfeffer (1914–1966), was one of the lucky ones.

The wrecked submarine was classified as a "military cemetery" in 1999 by the French authorities: divers are then warned that going inside the boat is strictly forbidden.

Summary of raiding history

References

Bibliography

External links

World War II submarines of Germany
U-boats sunk in 1942
Shipwrecks in the Bay of Biscay
World War II shipwrecks in the Atlantic Ocean
1941 ships
U-boats sunk by mines
Ships built in Bremen (state)
German Type IX submarines
U-boats commissioned in 1941
Maritime incidents in October 1942